Portrettet (The Portrait) is a Norwegian comedy film from 1954. It was directed by Per Aabel and Borgwall Skaugen. They also wrote the script for the film, which was based on a concept by Odd Grythe and Randi Kolstad. Aabel played the lead role in the film.

Plot
The film takes place in the idyllic town of Solsund, where Per Haug lives. He is a pharmacist, bachelor, amateur painter, and leader of the political opposition in the city council. One day he rushes home from a stormy city council meeting and angrily paints a portrait of Mayor Abrahamsen. Haug's anger is not only due to different political views, but also to the fact that Abrahamsen is trying to seduce Haug's housekeeper.

One day, Haug is visited by a childhood friend from Oslo. When the friend travels home, he takes the portrait of their old school teacher painted by Haug. Haug learns that painting has become the sensation of the year at the Autumn Exhibition in Oslo.

Cast
Per Aabel as Per Haug, a pharmacist
Wenche Foss as Sosse Laurantzon, a shipowner's wife
Nanna Stenersen as Miss Thorsen, Haug's housekeeper
Ingolf Rogde as Abrahamsen, a butcher and mayor
Espen Skjønberg as Nilsen, a pharmacist
Sigurd Magnussøn as Langerud, a teacher
Folkman Schaanning as Johansen, an editor
Harald Heide Steen as Ola
Ulf Selmer as Hammer, a pharmacist
Unni Torkildsen as Mrs. Hammer
Kirsten Sørlie as Elise Hammer
Stevelin Urdahl as Anders
Einar Vaage as Bjerkås, a lawyer
Rolf Christensen as Wilhelm Borch, a painter
Aud Schønemann as Mirakel
Eugen Skjønberg as Vakt
Per Asplin as a singer in the Solsund Singers
Nora Brockstedt as a singer in the Solsund Singers
Fredrik Conradi as a singer in the Solsund Singers
Oddvar Sanne as a singer in the Solsund Singers
Sølvi Wang as a singer in the Solsund Singers
Marit Halset 		
Jan Pande-Rolfsen 		
Paal Rocky 		
Erna Schøyen 		
Vesla Stenersen

References

External links
 

Norwegian comedy films
1950s Norwegian-language films
1954 comedy films
Norwegian black-and-white films